Existentia is the fifth album by Norwegian black/gothic metal band Trail of Tears. It was released on January 26 (Europe) and January 30 (USA), 2007.

It is the last full-length album recorded with Kjetil Nordhus, Runar Hansen, Kjell Rune Hagen and Jonathan Perez, all of whom left the band in November 2006.

Track listing
 "Deceptive Mirrors" – 4:28
 "My Comfort" – 4:37
 "Venom Inside My Veins" – 4:42
 "Decadence Becomes Me" – 4:20
 "She Weaves Shadows" – 4:48
 "The Closing Walls" – 4:50
 "Empty Room" – 4:35
 "Poisonous Tongues" – 4:18
 "As It Penetrates" – 4:12
 "Shades of Yesterday" – 4:15

Personnel
Ronny Thorsen - vocals
Kjetil Nordhus - clean vocals
Runar Hansen - guitars
Kjell Rune Hagen - bass guitar
 Jonathan Pérez - drums

Guest musicians
Emmanuelle Zoldan - mezzo-soprano vocals
Bernt Moen - keyboards

References

Trail of Tears (band) albums
2007 albums
Napalm Records albums